Mark Armstrong (born 5 November 1972) is a British jazz trumpeter, musical director, composer, arranger, and educator.

Biography 
Armstrong was born in Newcastle upon Tyne, northern England. At the age of five he moved to Amersham and attended Dr Challoner's Grammar School, playing with the Aylesbury Music Centre Dance Band and Buckinghamshire County Youth Orchestra. He studied then for a degree in music at the University of Oxford, when he played with the Oxford University Jazz Orchestra and helped to reform the Oxford University Big Band. He subsequently took a postgraduate course in jazz and studio music at the Guildhall School of Music and Drama in London.

Since 2008, Mark Armstrong has been Jazz Professor at the Royal College of Music (RCM) in London. Since 2011, he has been the Artistic and Music Director of the UK National Youth Jazz Orchestra (NYJO). He directs the RCM Swing Band and the RCM Big Band.

Armstrong was nominated in the best trumpet category of the 2007 Ronnie Scott Jazz Awards. He was also a winner of the BBC Big Band Competition arranging prize.

Mark Armstrong lives in London. He is married to the conductor Elinor Corp and they have three children.

References

External links
 Mark Armstrong website

Year of birth missing (living people)
Living people
musicians from Newcastle upon Tyne
People educated at Dr Challoner's Grammar School
Alumni of the University of Oxford
Alumni of the Guildhall School of Music and Drama
Academics of the Royal College of Music
English jazz trumpeters
Male trumpeters
English artistic directors
English jazz composers
Male jazz composers
English male composers
Music directors
Jazz arrangers
21st-century trumpeters
21st-century British male musicians